Yunmen Wenyan (c. 860–949) was a Zen Buddhist master.

Yunmen may also refer to:
Yunmen school of Chan Buddhism, named after Yunmen Wenyan
Yunmen, an acupuncture point on the lung meridian
Yunmen Subdistrict of Hechuan District, Chongqing
Yunmen Dajuan, a legendary ritual dance from the Yellow Emperor era, see Yayue and History of Chinese dance
Cloud Gate Dance Theater, Taiwanese modern dance group